The Queensland Museum is the state museum of Queensland, dedicated to natural history, cultural heritage, science and human achievement.  The museum currently operates from its headquarters and general museum in South Brisbane with specialist museums located in North Ipswich in Ipswich, East Toowoomba in Toowoomba, and in Townsville City in Townsville.

The museum is funded by the Queensland Government.

History

The Queensland Museum was founded by the Queensland Philosophical Society on 20 January 1862, one of the principal founders being Charles Coxen, and had several temporary homes in Brisbane, Queensland, Australia. The temporary homes included: The Old Windmill (1862–1869), Parliament House (1869–1873) and the General Post Office (1873–1879).

The Queensland Government built a home for the museum in William Street (later called the John Oxley State Library), with Queensland Museum moving there in 1879.  The museum occupied the William Street location  for 20 years.

In 1899, the Queensland Museum moved into the Exhibition Hall (now called the Old Museum), on Gregory Terrace in the Brisbane suburb of Bowen Hills, remaining there for 86 years.

In 1986, the Queensland Museum moved to the Queensland Cultural Centre at South Bank, where the museum is adjacent to the Queensland Art Gallery. Both a tunnel and pedestrian bridge connect the Museum and Art Gallery buildings with the Queensland Performing Arts Centre.  Three lifts were added to the bridge in 2004 to provide access to the platforms of the Cultural Centre busway station.  There is a large sculpture of a Cicada in front of the centre lift.

Curators and directors 
 1872 – Karl Theodor Staiger (first professional curator)
 1910 – Ronald Hamlyn-Harris (former science teacher at Toowoomba Grammar School)
 1918–1945 — Albert Heber Longman
 19??–1969 – Jack Tunstall Woods 
 1969 – c. 1989 – Dr Alan Bartholomai, AM

Museum Network

The Queensland Museum Network now operates at a number of locations.

Queensland Museum  
Queensland Museum is located at South Brisbane in the Queensland Cultural Centre alongside the State Library of Queensland, the Queensland Art Gallery, the Gallery of Modern Art and the Queensland Performing Arts Centre.

Queensland Museum connects visitors to Queensland, its people and their stories of the past, present and future.

Popular exhibitions include travelling shows from Australia and around the world as well as fascinating exhibitions revealing the story of Queensland, including its incredible prehistoric past, the cultures of Queensland's Aboriginal Peoples and Torres Strait Islanders and exhibitions revealing Queensland's unique biodiversity.

The museum is also a world-class research facility in the fields of biodiversity, geoscience and cultural history.

Queensland Museum is home to SparkLab, which offers hands-on, interactive activities for kids and grown-ups alike that reveal the science behind our everyday lives.

Museum of Lands, Mapping and Surveying 
The Museum of Lands, Mapping and Surveying opened in 1982 and is at 317 Edward Street, Brisbane.

Workshops Rail Museum 
The Workshops Rail Museum opened in August 2002 and is housed in the North Ipswich Railway Workshops. The collection includes 15 items of rolling stock and thousands of smaller items. Some operational steam locomotives from the Queensland Rail Heritage Fleet are often placed on display within the museum when not required for main line use.

Cobb & Co Museum 
In 1987, when the Queensland Museum required more room to display its horse-drawn coaches and carriages, the museum opened its Cobb & Co Museum campus in Toowoomba, Queensland.

Cobb+Co Museum is home to the National Carriage Collection.  The museum's collection includes examples of a vast range of vehicles from the horse-drawn era, from farm wagons and delivery carts to the Rolls-Royce of Carriages, the landau.

Cobb+Co Museum run a heritage workshops program.  Workshops include blacksmithing, silversmithing, leadlighting and leatherwork.

Museum of Tropical Queensland 
The Museum of Tropical Queensland is located in Townsville. The star attraction is the HMS Pandora gallery. Sent to catch the famous HMS Bounty and her mutinous crew, the Pandora sank off the coast of Cape York in 1791. Hundreds of artefacts have been recovered from the wreck and are on display.

The most popular area for kids is the MindZone, an interactive science centre. Other galleries celebrate the rainforest, corals and marine creatures from the deep sea and fossil past.

World Science Festival Brisbane 
The Queensland Museum Network holds exclusive licence to host the World Science Festival in the Asia Pacific region. The inaugural World Science Festival Brisbane was held in 2016. The festival runs in March each year, based in Brisbane, with regional satellite events taking place in Toowoomba, Townsville and Chinchilla, Queensland.

Recent and Future Exhibitions
 Afghanistan: Hidden Treasures from the National Museum, Kabul was a major touring exhibition  held 5 September 2013 - 27 January 2014, which showcased 230 priceless objects from between 2200 BC and AD 200. The exhibition provided a glimpse into the world of the ancient Silk Road and some of the most remarkable archaeological finds in all of Central Asia. Included in the exhibition were jewellery, sculpture and gold work.
  Mummy: Secrets of the Tomb was a major exhibition of four Egyptian mummies and over 100 pieces from the British Museum, London, held from 19 April - 21 October 2012.

Queensland Museum Medal
The first Queensland Museum Medal was awarded in 1987. Recipients of the Queensland Museum Medal for research include:

 1987 — Professor Mike Archer
 1988 — Mr Jack Woods, ISO — Mr F.S. Colliver, OBE — Emeritus Prof. Syd Prentice — Mr Jack Woods, ISO — Mr Terry Tebble — Mr Don Vernon — Dr Valerie Davis
 1989 — Mr Leonard J. Taylor 
 1990 — Mr J.C.H. Gill, AM MBE — Mr I.G. Morris CMG
 1991 — Dr Patricia Mather AO
 1992 — Mr R.I. (Sam) Harrison MBE — Mr Doug Traves OBE — Professor Colin Dobson
 1993 — Dr Robert Paterson
 1995 — Dr Elwyn Hegarty — Professor Don Nicklin
 1996 — Dr Mary Wade
 1997 — Mr John Lyons
 1999 — Mr Ian Venables   
 2000 — Keith McDonald — Dr Alan Bartholomai
 2003 — Ms Jeanette Covacevich AM — Mr Steve Irwin
 2004 — Dr Lester Cannon — Dr Dan Robinson — Dr Robert Anderson OAM
 2005 — Mrs Nerolie Withnall — Mrs Rae Sheridan — Mr Bruce Campbell 
 2006 — The Elliott Family — Mr Bill O’Brien OBE OAM 
 2007 — Mr Bill Kitson — Dr Geoff Monteith
 2008 — Dr Steve Van Dyck — Mr Vince O’Rourke AM   
 2009 — Ms Anne Jones — Dr Carden Wallace — Mr Michael Quinnell
 2010 — Sir David Attenborough — Dr John Hooper
 2011 — Professor Peter Andrews AO — Dr John Stanisic
 2012 — Professor Ronald J. Quinn, AM

Repatriation of human remains and objects
The Museum's program of returning and reburying ancestral remains and cultural property belonging to Indigenous Australians, which had been collected by the museum between 1870 and 1970, has been under way since the 1970s. As of November 2018, the museum had the remains of 660 Aboriginal and Torres Strait Islander people stored in their "secret sacred room" on the fifth floor.

See also

List of museums in Queensland
North Stradbroke Island Historical Museum
Repatriation of human remains - Australia
Steve Van Dyck, senior curator of vertebrates
Scott Hocknull, senior curator of geology

References

Bibliography

External links

Queensland Museum
Queensland Museum — Find Out About
Queensland Museum — Popular Publications
Queensland Museum South Bank - Queensland Museum campus in Brisbane (South East Queensland)
The Workshops Rail Museum - Queensland Museum campus in Ipswich (South East Queensland) 
Cobb+Co Museum - Queensland Museum campus in Toowoomba (South East Queensland)
Museum of Tropical Queensland — a Queensland Museum campus in Townsville (North Queensland)
Queensland Museum Discover Queensland Buildings website

Museums in Brisbane
Local museums in Australia
Natural history museums in Australia
Railway museums in Queensland
Museums established in 1862
Museums in Queensland
Dinosaur sculptures
Landmarks in Brisbane
South Brisbane, Queensland
Tourist attractions in Brisbane
Modernist architecture in Australia
1862 establishments in Australia
Queensland Cultural Centre